This is a list of electoral results for the Electoral district of Newland in South Australian state elections.

Members for Newland

Election results

Elections in the 2020s

Elections in the 2010s

Elections in the 2000s

Elections in the 1990s

 Newland was a notionally Labor held seat at the redistribution.

Elections in the 1980s

 Newland became a notional Liberal held seat in the redistribution.

Elections in the 1970s

References

SA elections archive: Antony Green ABC
2002 SA election: Antony Green ABC

South Australian state electoral results by district